Eugongylinae is a subfamily of skinks within the family Scincidae. The genera in this subfamily were previously found to belong the Eugongylus group in the large subfamily Lygosominae.

Genera

The subfamily Eugongylinae contains 469 species in 51 genera.

 Ablepharus (18 species)
 Acritoscincus (3 species)
 Alpinoscincus (2 species)
 Anepischetosia (1 species)
 Austroablepharus (3 species)
 Caesoris (1 species)
 Caledoniscincus (14 species)
 Carinascincus (8 species)
 Carlia (46 species)
 Celatiscincus (2 species)
 Cophoscincopus (4 species)
 Cryptoblepharus (53 species)
 Emoia (78 species)
 Epibator (3 species)
 Eroticoscincus (1 species)
 Eugongylus (5 species)
 Geomyersia (2 species)
 Geoscincus (1 species)
 Graciliscincus (1 species)
 Harrisoniascincus (1 species)
 Kanakysaurus (2 species)
 Kuniesaurus (1 species)
 Lacertaspis (5 species)
 Lacertoides (1 specie)
 Lampropholis (14 species)
 Leiolopisma (4 species)
 Leptosiaphos (18 species)
 Liburnascincus (4 species)
 Lioscincus (2 species)
 Lobulia (7 species)
 Lygisaurus (14 species)
 Marmorosphax (5 species)
 Menetia (5 species)
 Morethia (8 species)
 Nannoscincus (12 species)
 Nubeoscincus (2 species)
 Oligosoma (53 species)
 Panaspis  (21 species)
 Phaeoscincus (2 species)
 Phasmasaurus (2 species)
 Phoboscincus (2 species)
 Proablepharus (2 species)
 Pseudemoia (6 species)
 Pygmaeascincus  (3 species)
 Saproscincus (12 species)
 Sigaloseps  (6 species)
 Simiscincus (1 species)
 Tachygia (1 species)
 Techmarscincus (1 species)
 Tropidoscincus'' (3 species)

References